The Indian Association Ground is a cricket ground in Singapore. It has hosted matches in the 2009 ICC World Cricket League Division Six and the 2012 ICC World Cricket League Division Five tournaments, and qualification matches for the 2018 Under-19 Cricket World Cup. It hosted matches in the Regional Finals of the 2018–19 ICC T20 World Cup Asia Qualifier tournament in July 2019.

List of centuries

Twenty20 Internationals

References

Cricket grounds in Singapore
Sport in Singapore